Els Plans is a village in Andorra, located in the parish of Canillo. It is one of the 44 official poblacions of Andorra and, as of 2009, its population was of 54.

Geography
The village is located on a mountain road near Ransol and L'Aldosa de Canillo, above the National Road CG-2.

References

External links
Els Plans on fallingrain.com

Populated places in Andorra
Canillo